Stanley Neville James (3 January 1932 – 12 October 2002) was a New Zealand cricketer. He was a right-handed batsman and right-arm medium-pace bowler who played for Otago. He was born and died in Wanganui.

James made a single first-class appearance for the team, during the 1953–54 season, against Fiji. As a tailender, James did not bat in the match, but bowled 20 overs, taking figures of 1-73.

See also
 List of Otago representative cricketers

External links
Stanley James at CricketArchive 

1932 births
2002 deaths
New Zealand cricketers
Otago cricketers